Lake Durusu (also called Lake Terkos or Targus) is a lake in Thrace region of Turkey. It would be eliminated by the planned Istanbul Canal.

Description 
The lake lies in İstanbul Province. Depending on the rainfall, this lake with a 162 million m3 of the water potential satisfies approximately 20% of the water needs of Istanbul and surrounding settlements.

Currently there is no connection to the sea and it is a fresh water lake fed by a number of creeks the most important one being the Istrance creek.

History 
It is known that the history of village where the lake is located is about 900 years old.  The area around the lake was a pirates' settlement in the medieval ages. A monastery named Trikos was built by the Genoese. In the 19th century the lake was used as the main water source of Istanbul. In 1868 the concession of the lake and its environment was granted to an Ottoman - French company.

Facilities 
In order to solve the water problem of Istanbul in the 19th century, samples had been taken from here. The researches showed that lake Durusu is a drinking water source. So, facilities were built for paying the water needs in this region. Thus, part one fifth of İstanbul inhabitants use this lake for drinking water.

References

Durusu
Landforms of Istanbul Province
Important Bird Areas of Turkey